Zabrus crassus is a species of ground beetle in the Macarozabrus subgenus that is endemic to the Canary Islands.

References

Beetles described in 1828
Endemic fauna of the Canary Islands
Zabrus